Roosevelt (born Marius Lauber on 29 September 1990) is a German singer, songwriter and producer from Viersen. He is signed to Greco-Roman.

Music career 
His first project was Beat!Beat!Beat!, an indie teenage band where he was the drummer. Years later the band separated and he became a soloist.

He then released his acclaimed debut EP 'Elliot' in 2013. The lead single 'Elliot' was named as Pitchfork's 'Best New Track'. Roosevelt then released the double-A side 'Night Moves/Hold On' in 2015 on Greco-Roman which continued a warm synth-pop, Balearic-influenced sound.

In April 2016, he announced his self-titled debut album, set for release on 19 August 2016, on Greco-Roman/City Slang, with the video for tracks "Colours" and "Moving On".

He has remixed the likes of Glass Animals, Jax Jones, Truls, Sundara Karma, Luka Vasta and Kakkmaddafakka, and on tour has supported Hot Chip, Totally Enormous Extinct Dinosaurs and Crystal Fighters.

In June 2018, he announced a second album, Young Romance. It was released on 28 September 2018. The first single from this album, "Under the Sun," was released on 27 June 2018.

In March 2019, he released 'Falling Back' and a cover of Fleetwood Mac's "Everywhere" on W Records. The next year, 'Everywhere' was featured in We Bare Bears: The Movie.

On 10 June 2020, Roosevelt released the single Sign, which was the first original material since his sophomore album Young Romance. Roosevelt went on to release another four singles (Echoes, Feels Right, Strangers & Lovers) before his third studio album, Polydans, which was released on 26 February 2021.

Discography

Albums

Singles

Remixes
Glass Animals - Pools (Roosevelt Remix) (2014)
Glass Animals - Life Itself (Roosevelt Remix) (2016)
Sinkane - Telephone (Roosevelt Remix) (2016)
CHVRCHES - Get Out (Roosevelt Remix) (2018)
Rhye - Summer Days (Roosevelt Remix) (2018)
 Charlotte Gainsbourg - Bombs Away (Roosevelt Remix) (2019)
Josin - In The Blank Space (Roosevelt Remix) (2019)
Purple Disco Machine - Hypnotized (Roosevelt Remix) (2020)
 Bad Sounds - Move Into Me (feat. Broods) (Roosevelt Remix) (2021)
Selah Sue - Pills (Roosevelt Remix) (2022)
Balthazar - Linger On (Roosevelt Remix) (2022)
Taylor Swift - Anti-Hero (Roosevelt Remix) (2022)

Compilations

Music videos

References 

1990 births
German electronic musicians
Living people
Synth-pop singers
21st-century German male singers
City Slang artists